is a Japanese football player. He plays for Gamba Osaka.

Career
Tsubasa Adachi joined J1 League club Gamba Osaka in 2017.

Career statistics

Reserves performance

Last Updated: 2 December 2018

References

External links

2000 births
Living people
Association football people from Hyōgo Prefecture
Japanese footballers
J1 League players
J3 League players
Gamba Osaka players
Gamba Osaka U-23 players
Association football midfielders